This is the List of Serbs of Bosnia and Herzegovina.

Art

Performing arts

Cinema and theatre

Emir Kusturica (born 1954), filmmaker, actor and musician
Zdravko Šotra (born 1933), film and television director and screenwriter
Rudi Alvađ (1929–1988), film, radio and television actor and comedian
Predrag Golubović (1935–1994), film director and screenwriter
Nele Karajlić (born 1962), comedian, musician, composer, actor and television director living
Karl Malden (1912–2009), Oscar-winning actor
Marko Todorović (1929–2000), actor
Boro Stjepanović (born 1946), actor
Nataša Ninković (born 1972), actress
Danina Jeftić (born 1986), actress
Nebojša Glogovac (1969–2018), actor
Nikola Pejaković (born 1966), actor
Tihomir Stanić (born 1960), actor
Sergej Trifunović (born 1972), actor
Davor Dujmović (1969–1999), actor
Goran Kostić (born 1971), actor
Predrag Tasovac (1922–2010), actor
Branko Pleša (1926–2001), actor
Branko Đurić (born 1962), actor, comedian, director and musician
Boro Drašković (born 1935), director, playwright and screenwriter
Ognjenka Milićević (1927–2008), director, acting professor, and theatre expert
Brad Dexter (1917–2002), American actor
Gordon Bijelonic, American film producer
Ogden Gavanski, Canadian film producer

Music

Dušan Šestić, musician and composer of the national anthem of Bosnia and Herzegovina
Baja Mali Knindža, folk singer
Đorđe Novković, Yugoslav songwriter, and father of Boris Novković
Boro Drljača, folk singer
Branka Sovrlić, folk singer
Dejan Matić, pop-folk singer
Goran Bregović, musician, Croat father and Serb mother
Indira Radić, pop-folk singer
Ipe Ivandić, rock drummer
Ljiljana Petrović, pop singer
Marinko Rokvić, folk singer
Marta Savić, Yugoslav and Serbian singer
Maya Berović, pop-singer
Mile Kitić, Yugoslav and Serbian singer
Milić Vukašinović, musician
Milena Plavšić, folk singer
Miloš Bojanić, Yugoslav and Serbian singer
Minja Subota, composer, musician, entertainer and photographer
Mitar Mirić, Yugoslav and Serbian singer
Miroslav Čangalović, opera singer
Mladen Vojičić Tifa, folk-rock singer
Nada Obrić, folk singer
Nedeljko Bajić Baja, Serbian singer
Romana Panić, pop singer
Sanja Maletić, turbo-folk singer
Saša Matić, singer
Seka Aleksić, pop-folk singer
Srđan Čolić, pop-dance musician
Vlado Pravdić, organist
Srđan Marjanović, singer-songwriter
Vukašin Brajić, pop-rock singer
Zdravko Čolić, singer
Željko Samardžić, singer
Jadranka Stojaković, singer
Božo Vrećo, sevdalinka singer
Marija Šestić, singer
Lepi Mića, singer
Marija Šestić, singer

Visual arts

Miloš Bajić, painter
Jovan Bijelić, painter
Radomir Damnjanović, painter and conceptual artist
Lazar Drljača, painter
Oste Erceg, painter
Nedeljko Gvozdenović, painter
Kosta Hakman, painter
Momo Kapor, painter and novelist
Svetislav Mandić, painter, copier, fresco conserver and writer
Roman Petrović, painter
Ljubomir Popović, painter
Sreten Stojanović, sculptor
Slobodanka Stupar, visual artist
Todor Švrakić, painter
Rista Vukanović, painter

Literature
Writers
Meša Selimović (1910–1982), writer, Bosnian Muslim by birth
Svetozar Ćorović (1875–1919), novelist
Petar Kočić (1877–1916), writer
Veselin Masleša (1906–1943), writer, activist and Yugoslav Partisan
Branko Ćopić (1915–1984), writer
Svetozar Koljević (1930–2016), literary critic and historian; translator
Jovan Deretić (1934–2002), professor of literature and author of Serbian literary history
Gavro Vučković Krajišnik
Anabela Basalo, novelist
Isidora Bjelica, prose writer, playwright and public figure

Poets
Sima Milutinović Sarajlija (1791–1847), poet, hajduk, translator, historian, philologist, diplomat and adventurer
Jovan Dučić, poet, writer and diplomat
Skender Kulenović, poet 
Aleksa Šantić, poet
Duško Trifunović, poet and writer
Jovan Sundečić, poet and priest
Pero Zubac (1945)

Epic poetry
Filip Višnjić, epic poet and gusle player

Sciences and engineering
Milan Budimir (1891–1975), classical studies expert, linguist and academic.
Vaso Čubrilović (1897–1990), historian.
Vladimir Ćorović (1885–1941), historian and academic.
Petar Đurković (1908–1981), astronomer.
Vlado Kešelj, computer scientist.
Danilo Mandic (1963), electrical engineer.
Svetislav Mandić (1921–2003), historian, copier, fresco conserver, poet and painter.
Sima Milutinović (1899–1981), mechanical engineer and the most prolific Yugoslav aircraft constructor.
Radovan Samardžić (1922–1994), historian.
Milorad Ekmečić (1928–2015), historian and academic.
Ljubisav Rakić (born 1931), physician, professor and academic.
Ranko Bugarski (born 1933), linguist.
Rade Mihaljčić (born 1937), historian and academic.
Milorad Simić (born 1946), linguist and academic.
Tibor Živković (1966–2013), medievalist and academic.
Vladimir Terzija (1962), electrical engineer.
Stevo Todorčević (born 1955), mathematician.

Politics
Yugoslavia / SR Bosnia and Herzegovina
Cvijetin Mijatović, former President of the Presidency of SFR Yugoslavia
Vojislav Kecmanović, former President of the People's Assembly of SR Bosnia and Herzegovina
Đuro Pucar, former President of the People's Assembly and President of the Executive Council of SR Bosnia and Herzegovina
Vlado Šegrt, former President of the People's Assembly of SR Bosnia and Herzegovina
Ratomir Dugonjić, former President of the Presidency of SR Bosnia and Herzegovina 
Obrad Piljak, former President of the Presidency of SR Bosnia and Herzegovina 
Milanko Renovica, former President of the Presidency and President of the Executive Council of SR Bosnia and Herzegovina 
Rodoljub Čolaković, former President of the Executive Council of SR Bosnia and Herzegovina
Milan Gorkić, former President of the League of Communists of Yugoslavia
Bogoljub Kujundžić, former Ban of Vrbas Banovina
Aristotel Petrović, former Mayor of Sarajevo
Ljubo Kojo, former Mayor of Sarajevo
Vaso Radić, former Mayor of Sarajevo

Bosnia and Herzegovina / Republika Srpska
Momčilo Krajišnik, former member of the Presidency of Bosnia and Herzegovina
Tatjana Ljujić-Mijatović, former member of the Presidency of Bosnia and Herzegovina
Živko Radišić, former member of the Presidency of Bosnia and Herzegovina and Mayor of Banja Luka
Mirko Šarović, former member of the Presidency of Bosnia and Herzegovina
Borislav Paravac, former member of the Presidency of Bosnia and Herzegovina
Nebojša Radmanović, former member of the Presidency of Bosnia and Herzegovina and Mayor of Banja Luka
Mladen Ivanić, former member of the Presidency of Bosnia and Herzegovina and former Prime Minister of Republika Srpska
Dragan Mikerević, former member of the Presidency of Bosnia and Herzegovina and former Prime Minister of Republika Srpska
Milorad Dodik,  incumbent member of the Presidency of Bosnia and Herzegovina, former President and former Prime Minister of Republika Srpska
Spasoje Tuševljak, former Chairmen of the Council of Minister of Bosnia and Herzegovina 
Dragan Mikerević, former Chairmen of the Council of Minister of Bosnia and Herzegovina
Nikola Špirić, former Chairmen of the Council of Minister of Bosnia and Herzegovina
Boro Bosić, former Co-Chairman of the Council of Ministers of Bosnia and Herzegovina
Zoran Tegeltija, incumbent Chairmen of the Council of Minister of Bosnia and Herzegovina
Radovan Karadžić, former President of Republika Srpska
Biljana Plavšić, former President of Republika Srpska
Nikola Poplašen, former President of Republika Srpska
Mirko Šarović, former President of Republika Srpska
Dragan Čavić, former President of Republika Srpska
Milan Jelić, former President of Republika Srpska
Igor Radojičić, former acting President of Republika Srpska and Mayor of Banja Luka
Rajko Kuzmanović, former President of Republika Srpska
Željka Cvijanović, incumbent President of Republika Srpska and former Prime Minister of Republika Srpska
Pero Bukejlović, former Prime Minister of Republika Srpska
Aleksandar Džombić, former Prime Minister of Republika Srpska
Radovan Višković, incumbent Prime Minister of Republika Srpska
Nedeljko Čubrilović, former Speaker of the National Assembly of Republika Srpska
Draško Stanivuković, incumbent Mayor of Banja Luka
Mladen Grujičić, incumbent Mayor of Srebrenica
Branislav Borenović, incumbent president of the Party of Democratic Progress
Predrag Kojović, incumbent president of the Our Party
Mićo Sokolović, founder of the labour movement in Bosnia and Herzegovina
Dunja Mijatović, Commissioner for Human Rights

Serbia
Jovan Marinović, former Prime Minister of Serbia
Zoran Đinđić, former Prime Minister of Serbia and Mayor of Belgrade
Slobodan Unković, President of the National Assembly of Serbia
Boris Tadić, former President of Serbia
Vojislav Šešelj, founder and president of Serbian Radical Party and a former Deputy Prime Minister of Serbia
Zorana Mihajlović, Deputy Prime Minister of Serbia and Minister of Energy and Mining; former Minister of Construction, Transport and Infrastructure
Saša Radulović, former Minister of Economy of Serbia
Nela Kuburović, former Minister of Justice of Serbia
Darija Kisić Tepavčević, Minister of Labour, Employment, Veteran and Social Policy of Serbia
Vjerica Radeta, former Vice President of the National Assembly of Serbia

Military people
Omar Pasha, Ottoman general and governor
Srđan Aleksić
Emanuel Cvjetićanin, Austro-Hungarian Feldmarschalleutnant
Slobodan Princip, Yugoslav Partisan
Petar Baćović, Chetnik
Jezdimir Dangić, Chetnik
Jeronim Ljubibratić, Habsburg general
Mićo Ljubibratić, rebel
Pecija, rebel
Golub Babić, rebel
Prodan Rupar
Bogdan Zimonjić
Bogić Vučković

Rulers and royalty

Middle Ages
Beloje
Stephen, Duke of Bosnia
Miroslav of Hum
Hramko
Andrija, Prince of Hum
Prvoslav Radojević
Mrnjava
Domanek
Dražen Bogopenec
Milten Draživojević
Mišljen (veliki tepčija)
Dimitrije (veliki čelnik)
Vuk Kosača
Branivojević noble family
Vojin (magnate)
Vojislav Vojinović
Miloš Vojinović
Pribil
Pavle Radenović

Ottoman statesmen
Sokollu Mehmed Pasha
Lala Kara Mustafa Pasha
Sokolluzade Lala Mehmed Pasha
Telli Hasan Pasha

Sports

Individual sports

Jelena Lolović, alpine skier, Universiade champion
Žana Novaković, alpine skier
Ivana Španović, athlete (track and field), World and European Champion, Olympic bronze medalist 
Dragan Perić, athlete (track and field), World Championships bronze medalist
Borisav Pisić, athlete (track and field), Mediterranean Games champion
Draženko Mitrović, athlete (track and field), Paralympic Games silver medalist
Branko Dangubić, athlete (track and field)
Đuro Kodžo, athlete (track and field)
Vuk Rađenović, bobsledder
Slobodan Kačar, boxer, Olympic champion
Tadija Kačar, boxer, Olympic Games silver medalist
Milenko Zorić, canoer, World champion and Olympic Games silver medalist
Veselin Petrović, cyclist
Radomir Kovačević, judoka, Olympic Games bronze medalist
Nemanja Majdov, judoka, World champion
Aleksandar Kukolj, judoka, European champion
Mitar Mrdić, judoka
Radoje Đerić, rower, European Championships bronze medalist
Andrea Arsović, sports shooter, European champion
Srećko Pejović, sports shooter, European Championships silver medalist
Velimir Stjepanović, swimmer, European champion
Đorđe Marković, swimmer
Ivana Ninković, swimmer
Mladen Tepavčević, swimmer
Zoran Prerad, taekwondo practitioner, European champion
Andrea Petkovic, tennis player, World No.9
Nikola Ćaćić, tennis player, ATP Cup champion
Momir Kecman, wrestler, World Championships silver medalist
Boško Marinko, wrestler, European champion
Stevan Mićić, wrestler, European Games and European Championships medalist
Ognjen Topic, American Muay Thai Boxing champion

Team sports
Basketball

Borislav Stanković, former FIBA's Secretary General
Dražen Dalipagić, Olympic, World and European champion
Ratko Radovanović, Olympic, World and European champion
Dejan Bodiroga, World and European champion, Olympic silver medalist
Predrag Danilović, World and European champion, Olympic silver medalist
Žarko Paspalj, World and European champion, Olympic silver medalist
Slađana Golić, Olympic, World and European Championships silver medalist
Saša Čađo, Olympic bronze medalist and European champion
Jelica Komnenović, Olympic bronze medalist and Eurobasket silver medalist
Zoran Savić, World and European champion, Olympic silver medalist
Dragana Stanković, Olympic bronze medalist
Milan Gurović, World and European champion
Aleksandar Nikolić, World and European champion
Vladimir Radmanović, World champion
Veselin Petrović, European champion
Ognjen Kuzmić, NBA champion and Eurobasket silver medalist
Darko Miličić, NBA champion 
Vule Avdalović, Universiade champion
Vanja Plisnić, Universiade champion
Mile Ilić, Universiade champion
Draško Albijanić
Nemanja Gordić
Stefan Janković
Srđan Kalember
Dejan Kravić
Milan Milošević
Nebojša Popović
Dragan Raca
Boris Savović
Đoko Šalić
Marko Šutalo
Miroslav Todić
Dejan Todorović
Ratko Varda
Dušan Vukčević
Dalibor Ilić
Lara Mandić
Ivanka Matić
Slavica Pečikoza
Daliborka Vilipić

Football

Milan Galić, Olympic champion and European Championship silver medalist
Velimir Sombolac, Olympic champion
Branko Stanković, Olympic silver medalist
Vlado Čapljić, Olympic bronze medalist
Marko Marin, World Cup bronze medalist
Boško Antić, European Championship silver medalist
Ilija Pantelić, European Championship silver medalist
Savo Milošević, European Championship top scorers
Mijat Gaćinović, World U20 and European U19 champion
Srđan Babić, World U20 champion
Miladin Stevanović, World U20 champion
Ognjen Ožegović, European U19 champion
Dušan Bajević
Nemanja Bilbija
Predrag Đajić
Aleksandar Đurić
Milan Đurić
Mladen Krstajić
Ognjen Koroman
Zdravko Kuzmanović
Zvjezdan Misimović
Predrag Pašić
Ljupko Petrović
Saša Stević
Nikola Stipić
Neven Subotić
Nemanja Supić
Miloš Šestić
Siniša Ubiparipović
Ognjen Vranješ
Slavko Zagorac
Luka Jović

Handball

Svetlana Kitić, Olympic champion
Milorad Karalić, Olympic champion
Zlatan Arnautović, Olympic champion
Nebojša Popović, Olympic champion
Zdravko Rađenović, Olympic champion
Radmila Drljača, Olympic silver medalist
Vesna Radović, Olympic silver medalist
Mladen Bojinović, World Championship bronze medalist
Nebojša Golić, World Championship bronze medalist
Jasmina Jankovic, European Championship silver medalist
Dobrivoje Marković European Championship silver medalist
Aleksandar Knežević, European Championship bronze medalist
Danijel Šarić, World Championship silver medalist
Gorica Aćimović

Volleyball

Vladimir Grbić, Olympic and European champion
Nikola Grbić, Olympic and European champion
Tijana Bošković, World and European champion, Olympic silver medalist
Brankica Mihajlović, World and European champion, Olympic silver medalist
Đorđe Đurić, Olympic bronze medalist
Saša Starović, European champion
Jelena Blagojević, European champion and World Championship bronze medalist
Aleksandar Okolić, European and World League champion
Slađana Erić
Sanja Starović

Water polo
Duško Pijetlović, Olympic, World and European champion
Gojko Pijetlović, Olympic, World and European champion
Nikola Rađen, World and European champion, Olympic bronze medalist
Milan Muškatirović, Olympic and European Championship silver medalist

Religion
Patriarchs
Makarije Sokolović, Patriarch of Serbs (s. 1557–1571)
Antonije Sokolović, Patriarch of Serbs (s. 1571–1575)
Gerasim Sokolović, Patriarch of Serbs (s. 1575–1586)
Savatije Sokolović, Patriarch of Serbs (s. 1587)
Gavrilo II, Patriarch of Serbs (s. 1752)

Metropolitans and bishops
Gavrilo Avramović, Metropolitan of Dabar-Bosna (s. 1578–88)
Basil of Ostrog (1610–1671), Bishop of Zahumlje, born in Trebinje area
Visarion, Metropolitan of Herzegovina (s. 1590–1602), born in Herzegovina
Savatije Ljubibratić, Metropolitan of Zahumlje and Dalmatia (s. 1693–1716)
 Jovan Ćulibrk (1965)
 Grigorije Durić (1966)

Other
Nićifor Dučić (1832–1900), theologian, historian, philologist and writer
Martyr Vukašin of Klepci
Jovica Ilić (fl. 1834–), Orthodox priest, rebel leader
Pavle Tvrtković (fl. 1834–51), Orthodox priest, served at the Serbian court
Gavro Vučković Krajišnik, trader, politician and writer
Djoko Slijepčević, (1907–1993), church historian

Other
Tijana Arnautović, Miss Canada 2004
Luka Ćelović, businessman
Mila Mulroney, wife of former prime minister of Canada
Monika Radulovic, Miss Universe Australia 2015
Sava Vladislavich, Serbian diplomat, count and merchant-adventurer in the employ of Peter the Great
Nataša Vojnović, fashion model
Milomir Kovac (born 1962), German surgeon
Caroline Mulroney, Canadian politician
Ben Mulroney, Canadian television host
Sasa Radulovic, award-winning Canadian architect
Maja Vidaković Lalić, architect and founder of the Mikser Festival
Nedeljko Čabrinović, member of the Black Hand

See also
List of Serbs
List of Serbs of Croatia
List of Serbs of Montenegro
List of Serbs of the Republic of Macedonia
List of Serbs of Slovenia
List of Serbs of Albania

References

List
Lists of people by ethnicity
Bosnia and Herzegovina
Bosnia and Herzegovina